Kerrins is a surname. Notable people with the surname include:

Pat Kerrins (born 1936), English footballer
Wayne Kerrins (born 1965), English footballer

See also
Kerrin